Monk Simeon is the Serbian author of Vukan's Gospel. This service Gospel -- aprakos—is the earliest manuscript illuminated in Raška between the end of the 12th-century (1196) and the beginning of the 13th-century (1202). It is believed that several scribes worked on the creation of the manuscript, however, a monk named Simon was identified as the leading scribe who proofread, edited and completed the work in a monastic cave near the residence of the župan at Stari Ras. Two miniatures in the Vukan Gospel exist, John the Evangelist and Christ Emmanuel, showing Byzantine art influence.

See also
 Chernorizets Hrabar of the 9th century
 Anonymous Zećanin of the 11th century

 Saint Sava
 List of painters from Serbia
 Medieval Serbian literature

References 

13th-century Serbian writers
Serbian monks
12th-century Serbian writers
Serbian male writers